Sadeqabad (also Romanized as Şādeqābād) is a village in Badr Rural District, in the Central District of Ravansar County, Kermanshah Province, Iran. At the 2006 census, its population was 275, within 49 families.

References 

Populated places in Ravansar County